Barry George Hadlee (born 14 December 1941) is a former cricketer from New Zealand. He was a right-handed opening batsman. In a first-class career lasting from 1961–62 to 1980–81, he represented Canterbury 84 times.

Family
Hadlee was born in Christchurch, Canterbury, New Zealand. He is the brother of fellow national cricketers Dayle Hadlee and Sir Richard Hadlee and son of Walter Hadlee.

Domestic career
His most consistent form came late in his career. His most productive season was 1975–76, when he scored 582 runs at 44.76. He hit his highest score, 163 not out, in his final season against Otago.

International career
In 1975, Hadlee was called into the New Zealand team and played two One Day Internationals, one of them at the 1975 Cricket World Cup.

References

External links
 

1941 births
Living people
New Zealand One Day International cricketers
New Zealand cricketers
Canterbury cricketers
Cricketers at the 1975 Cricket World Cup
Cricketers from Christchurch
Barry